Ningxiang No. 7 High School, commonly abbreviated as (Ningxiang) Qizhong, is a public coeducational high school in Liushahe Town of Ningxiang, Hunan, China.

History
Ningxiang No. 7 High school traces its origins to the former Linshan Academy, founded by Wang Lingbo, Zhang Zhutao and He Lixuan in 1923, and Wang served as its principal.

In 1926, Niangxiang No. 6 School was merged into Linshan Academy.

In early 1930s, He Shuheng and Mei Yecheng disseminated Marxism-Leninism among the students.

After the establishment of the Communist State in 1949, it was changed to be a modern school initially called Fusi Wanxiao and then was renamed Linshan Primary School in 1955.

On April 8, 1958, the school changed its name as Ningxiang No. 7 Middle School.

In 1970, Ningxiang No. 7 Middle School was renamed Ningxiang No. 7 High School.

Athletics
 Basketball (men's and women's)
 Football (women's)

Notable alumni
 Hu Changsheng, major general of the PLA Air Force in Guangzhou Military Region.
 Tang Sulan, Children's literature writer.
 He Jiyuan, major general of Kuomintang Army.
 Yu Jixin, People's Daily reporter, teacher at Jinan University.
 Chen Huifang, Hunan Daily reporter.
 Luo Huizhong, professor at Central South University.
 Li Guiping, professor at Central South University.
 Chen Yuetang, vice-president of Hunan Agricultural University.
 Yu Jifan, associate professor at Xiangtan University.
 Liu Shuiming, deputy director of International Department of Hunan Daily.
 Li Ailian, director of Ningxiang Municipal Bureau of Education.
 Luo Guoyang, professor at Yale University.
 Luo Xixian, professor at Dalian Maritime University.
 Yu Xiaojian, director of Yuhua District Education Bureau.
 Chen Zhihua, researcher at State Oceanic Administration.

Gallery

References

External links

Educational institutions established in 1923
High schools in Changsha
1923 establishments in China